The Karakatuwhero River is a river of New Zealand. It is located in the Gisborne Region in the northeast the North Island.

See also
List of rivers of New Zealand

References

Rivers of the Gisborne District
Rivers of New Zealand